The Madagascar national beach soccer team represents Madagascar in international beach soccer competitions and is controlled by the Malagasy Football Federation, the governing body for football in Madagascar.

Current squad

 

(captain)

Achievements

CAF Beach Soccer Championship

See also
 2011 CAF Beach Soccer Championship
 2013 CAF Beach Soccer Championship
 2015 CAF Beach Soccer Championship

References

http://www.beachsoccer.com/teams/Madagascar Retrieved 2015-4-18.

http://www.beachsoccer.com/events/caf-beach-soccer-championships-seychelles-2015 Retrieved 2015-4-18.

External links
 http://www.cafonline.com/en-us/memberassociations/f%C3%A9d%C3%A9rationmalagasydefootball/Home

African national beach soccer teams
National sports teams of Madagascar